Barycypraea teulerei, common name Teulere's cowry, is a species of sea snail, a cowry, a marine gastropod mollusk in the family Cypraeidae, the cowries.

Description
They are highly variable in pattern. The dorsum surface is not particularly smooth and shiny as is commonly the case in cowries. The basic color is light beige or cream, with irregular dark brown patches on the top and many light brown spots on the sides. The calloused margins are whitish, while the base is white, with a large sinuous aperture with only traces of labial teeth. Barycypraea teulerei is externally similar to Barycypraea fultoni and Muracypraea mus.

Distribution
This species occurs only in the Arabian Sea along the mainland coast of Oman, and on Masirah Island.

Habitat
These cowries live in intertidal shallow waters, mainly on coral reef but also on sandy and muddy sea bed.

References

 Verdcourt, B. (1954). The cowries of the East African Coast (Kenya, Tanganyika, Zanzibar and Pemba). Journal of the East Africa Natural History Society 22(4) 96: 129-144, 17 pls

External links
 Bernaya teulerei
 A rare shell
 Biolib
 

Cypraeidae
Gastropods described in 1846